Laguna del Mort is a lake in the Province of Venezia, Veneto, Italy. Its surface area is 2.1 km². The pinewood around this lagoon has a lush vegetation: different kinds of flowers and trees live here. Wildlife is also rich: birds, insects, small mammals, reptiles and amphibians. 

In Summer a lot of nudists come to the beach which has been a nudist place for over 30 years.

Lakes of Veneto